= Los Chicos (Spanish band) =

Spanish rock band, formed in 2000

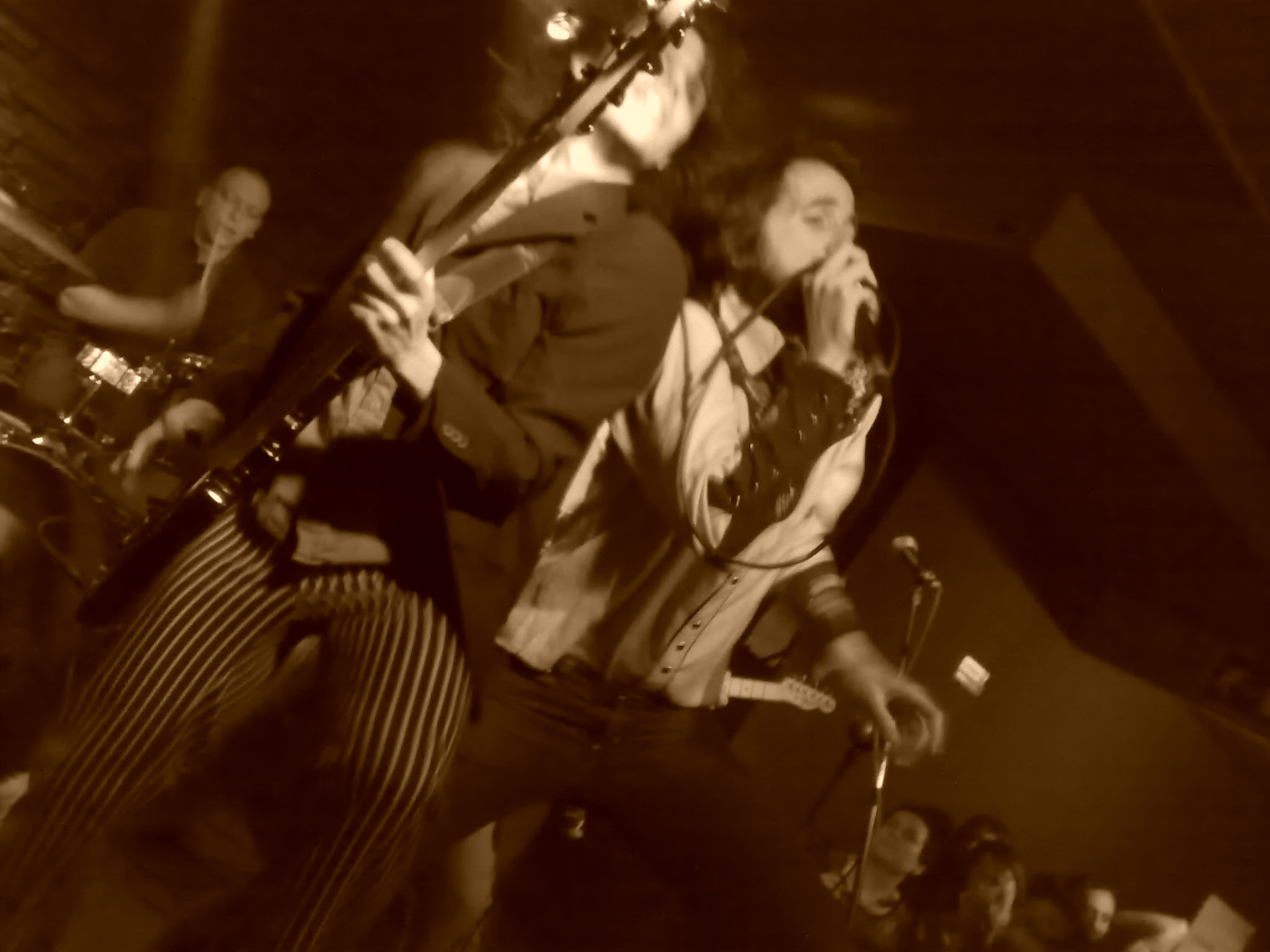
Los Chicos, Piña, Manu and Rafa in the Wurlitzer Ballroom, Madrid

Los Chicos are a Spanish rock band formed in 2000. They are not related to an earlier Spanish band active from 1978 to 1982.

== Albums ==
- Shakin' and Prayin 2003
- Fat Spark 2005
- Launching Rockets 2007
- We Sound Amazing but We Look like Shit 2009
- 10 years of Shakin' Fat and Launching Shit Compilation
- In the Age of Stupidity 2013
